Princess Magogo Stadium is a multi-purpose stadium in KwaMashu, a township near Durban, South Africa. It is currently used mostly for football matches and was utilized as a training field for teams that participated in the 2010 FIFA World Cup after being renovated in 2009 and brought up to FIFA standards.

The stadium is named after Princess Constance Magogo, a Zulu princess who spent much of her life as a singer and composer while developing an understanding for Zulu tradition and culture.

References

Soccer venues in South Africa
Sports venues in Durban